South Lampung Regency is a regency of Lampung, Sumatra, Indonesia, a strip of land surrounding the provincial capital of Bandar Lampung on its northern and eastern sides, and bounded to the west by the new Pesawaran Regency and to the south by the Sunda Strait; as such it is a major transit corridor to/from Java island.  It has an area of 2,245.93 km2, and a population of 909,989 at the 2010 census ) and 1,064,301 at the 2020 census; the official estimate as at mid 2021 was 1,071,727. The regency seat is the town of Kalianda.

The regency has seen a population influx as migrants escape the crushing population densities and everyday struggles of living in the massive urban paralysis of Greater Jakarta, and along with Bandar Lampung city its character is increasingly reflecting the cosmopolitan makeup of Jakartans rather than the surrounds of a typical provincial capital and hinterland.  This has resulted in flaring of ethnic tensions, including rioting.

Administrative Districts 
South Lampung Regency consists of seventeen districts (kecamatan), tabulated below with their areas and their populations at the 2010 census and the 2020 census, together with the official estimates as at mid 2021. The districts are grouped below for descriptive convenience into a "Northern zone" comprising the heavily populated areas suburban to Bandar Lampung city, and a "Southern zone" comprising the areas to the southeast of Bandar Lampung; these zones have no administrative significance. The table also includes the locations of the district administrative centres, the number of administrative villages (rural desa and urban kelurahan) in each district and its post code.

Notes: (a) the district includes 3 islands off the south coast of Sumatra. (b) the district includes 16 islands off the south coast of Sumatra, the largest being Pulau Sebuku, Pulau Sebesi and Pulau Krakatoa. (c) the district includes 10 islands off the south coast of Sumatra. (d) the district includes 12 islands off the south coast of Sumatra.

History
Pesawaran Regency, formerly that part of South Lampung Regency lying to the west of Bandar Lampung, was carved out of it in 2007.

In January 2011, tens of thousands of inhabitants of South Lampung had to be evacuated by the South Lampung Disaster Mitigation Agency (BPBD) in the seven districts of Kalianda, Rajabasa, Katibung, Sidomulyo, Ketapang, Sragi and Palas due to volcanic ash from the Mount Anak Krakatau. There is an observation station at Hargopancuran village in South Lampung used to monitor activity.

Lampung Saibatin Paksi Pak Sekala Brak in Gedung Dalom (West Lampung Regency) Customary area is spread is throughout Lampung Province, some even ante the area of South Sumatra Province, Semaka Tanggamus Regency, Bandar Lima Way Lima (Pesawaran Regency), Marga Lima Way Handak, Melinting (East Lampung), until outside the province of Lampung including Komering, Ranau, and Cikoneng Banten Province

Traditional 5 Marga Figure in South Lampung from Paksi Pak Sekala Brak in Gedung Dalom:
Cahaya Marga
Naga Berisang
Tihang Marga
Penyimbang Agung
Sesuhunan Sampurna Jaya
Four Panglima Kepaksian from Way Handak because South Lampung a storefront from the Sai Batin Indigenous Community, one Panglima in Paksi Pak Kepaksian Pernong Sekala Brak came from Tanggamus Regency.

See also
Pekon Gayam

References

External links

Regencies of Lampung